Wiktor Wojtas, better known as TaZ, is a Polish Counter-Strike player who was the in-game leader for Virtus.pro. He is one of the "Golden Five" group of Polish CS players who won many tournaments with a number of different esports teams. He has also played for AGAiN, Universal Soldiers, ESC Gaming, Frag eXecutors, Vitriolic, Wicked eSports, Meet Your Makers, and Pentagram G-Shock. Wojtas has been playing professionally since 2004.

TaZ and Virtus.pro famously won EMS One Katowice 2014, which was the first major to be held in Poland. They defeated Ninjas in Pyjamas 2–0 in the grand final. Over the years, TaZ and co. would rack up many tournament wins, giving them the famous nickname of "Virtus plow", notoriously having the ability to chain rounds together against their opponents in a momentum-driven playstyle. TaZ is considered one of the greatest Polish players to play Counter-Strike, alongside NEO, pasha, Loord, and LUq. TaZ and Virtus.pro won ELeague Season 1 over fnatic in the finals on July 30, 2016, ending the slump Virtus pro had been in. This would be one of the final victories VP would enjoy, and the roster which had held together since late 2013 disbanded in early 2018. As of October 2016, TaZ has won $476,809, the largest single prize being $80,000 from winning ELeague Season 1.

Tournament results
Bold denotes a CS:GO Major

Pentagram
 1st — 2006 Cyberathlete Professional League Championship Finals

PGS Gaming
 1st — World Cyber Games 2006

AGAiN
 1st — World Cyber Games 2009

Frag-Executors
 3rd — World Cyber Games 2010

PGS Gaming
 1st — World Cyber Games 2011

Universal Soldiers 
 9th-12th  — DreamHack Winter 2013

Virtus.pro
 1st — EMS One Katowice 2014
 3–4th — DreamHack Winter 2014 
 3-4th — ESL One Katowice 2015 
 3-4th — ESL One Cologne 2015 
 5-8th — DreamHack Open Cluj-Napoca 2015 
 5-8th — Intel Extreme Masters Season X – World Championship
 5-8th — MLG Major Championship: Columbus 
 3–4th — ESL One Cologne 2016
 1st — ELeague Season 1
 1st — DreamHack ZOWIE Open Bucharest 2016
 3rd — WESG 2016 World Finals
 2nd — ELEAGUE Major 2017
 1st — DreamHack Masters Las Vegas 2017
 7-8th — Intel Extreme Masters Season XI - World Championship

References

1986 births
Polish esports players
Counter-Strike players
MeetYourMakers players
Virtus.pro players
Living people
Place of birth missing (living people)